Frederica Montseny i Mañé (1905–1994) was a Spanish anarchist and intellectual who served as Minister of Health and Social Assistance in the Government of the Spanish Republic during the Civil War. She is known as a novelist and essayist and for being one of the first female ministers in Western Europe.

Early life
Frederica Montseny i Mañé was born on 12 February 1905 in Madrid, Spain. She was the sole surviving child of Joan Montseny and Teresa Mañé, both teachers and anarchists of Catalan extraction. They lived in Madrid because the 1896 Barcelona Corpus Christi procession bombing had led to her father being imprisoned and then exiled. The couple returned to Spain secretly and settled in the capital. From 1898, her parents jointly edited the fortnightly journal La Revista Blanca, one of the most significant anarchist publications of the time. The family put its savings into a house on the outskirts of Madrid. The developer that built the house threatened to sue her father when the latter accused him of stealing from the poor by taking money for houses that were never built. This forced the family to leave and spend the next years moving frequently and surviving occasional writing and farming. During Montseny's childhood, the Civil Guard would frequently visit the family home searching for her father. She would let them in as slowly as possible in order to give him time to hide.

Montseny was educated at home by her parents. After Montseny acquired basic reading and writing skills, her mother used progressive didactic methods to foster Montseny's curiosity, providing her with a wide range of reading material in order to encourage her to pursue her own intellectual interests. Montseny became acquainted with literature as well as social and political theory. She also credits the rural environment she grew up in with shaping her intellectual development. Throughout her life, she would return to nature when grappling with social questions.

Spanish Civil War and Minister of Health
Following the Spanish coup of July 1936, Montseny resolved to support the republican faction against the nationalists, considering a united front of anti-fascists to be necessary for the advancement of anarchism in Spain. Despite her support for the republicans, she quickly came to reject the violence in the republican-held territory, which she described as "a lust for blood inconceivable in honest man before". 

In November 1936, Francisco Largo Caballero invited the anarchists to join the Spanish government, as they were the largest of the anti-fascist groups and the other parties of the Popular Front wanted to neutralise their anti-statism. In an interview with Burnett Bolloten, Montseny explained that the principal impulse for the anarchists to join the government was their concern about the rise of the Communist Party to power, which they viewed as a threat to the Revolution. Despite her own misgivings about joining the government, Montseny was appointed as Minister of Health and Social Assistance, becoming the first woman in Spanish history to be a cabinet minister. 

From her ministerial post, Montseny oversaw the country's medical facilities, which had been completely overwhelmed by the conditions of the war, requiring the construction of orphanages and the provision of aid for refugees. She also collaborated with the Mujeres Libres in the advancement of women's rights, carrying out a series of wide-ranging reforms including: the introduction of child care for women in the workforce and the militias; the provision of women's education and healthcare; and the combatting of prostitution in Spain.

Soon after Montseny took office, on 6 November, the republican government moved to Valencia, fearing that Madrid would fall to the nationalist offensive. Montseny persuaded the anarchist militia leader Buenaventura Durruti to transfer from the Aragon front and defend the capital, where he fought and died at the Battle of Ciudad Universitaria. When the anarchists of Barcelona revolted during the May Days, Montseny appealed on behalf of the government for the militias to lay down their arms. But when she was unsuccessful, the government resolved to put down the anarchists by force, in what Montseny described as "the most terrible and bitter days of my life". By the time that Juan Negrin had consolidated power, Montseny considered the war to have already been lost, and thought the only remaining action would be to save as many lives as possible. Montseny subsequently left the cabinet and attempted to continue her efforts in uniting republican forces, but by 1938, the deterioration of the republican front had forced her to increasingly focus on feeding her family.

Exile 
In February 1939, Montseny and her family were forced to flee into exile by the nationalist offensive into Catalonia. Her mother died in Perpignan, while her father was imprisoned and husband held in an internment camp. Montseny initially relocated to Paris, where she helped in the relocation of Spanish refugees, in spite of her own struggle to make ends meet. During the Nazi occupation of France, Montseny fled into hiding in Occitania, where she was detained by the authorities of the French State. Although the French authorities had orders to extradite her to Spain, they eventually released Montseny, as she was pregnant with her youngest child.

In 1942, Montseny and her family attempted to relocate to Mexico, but their route was blocked by the war in North Africa, while both the Allies and Axis prevented any further emigration of Spanish refugees from France, forcing them to stay in Toulouse. Following the liberation of France, Montseny took part in the reorganization of the Confederación Nacional del Trabajo in exile and edited the organization's weekly newspaper. From Toulouse, she also wrote a weekly column in the French language anarchist newspaper Espoir and edited the journal Cénit. She briefly returned to Spain during the transition to democracy, during which her works were finally being republished. Following the death of her youngest daughter in 1977 and her husband in 1981, Montseny penned an autobiography, which was published in 1987.

Frederica Montseny i Mañé died in Toulouse on 14 January 1994, at the age of 88.

Personal life

In 1930, Montseny began an open relationship with Germinal Esgleas. The couple had three children together: her eldest daughter Vida was born in 1933; her son Germinal was born in June 1938; and her youngest daughter Blanca was born in 1941. She attempted to raise her daughters to be "free women" and her son to respect women, but when interviewed about this she remarked that she had been largely unsuccessful, due to the strong hold that traditional gender roles still had.

Legacy
Several streets, parks and schools are named in her memory in Spain, especially in Catalonia, and in cities like Paris.

Works

Novels
 Horas trágicas (1920)
 Amor de un día (1920)
 Ana María (1920)
 El amor nuevo (1920)
 El juego del amor y de la vida (1920)
 La mujer que huía del amor (1920)
 La vida que empieza (1920)
 Los caminos del mundo (1920)
 María Magda (1920)
 Maternidad (1920)
 Vampiresa (1920)
 Florecimiento (1925)
 La victoria (1925)
 Vida nueva (1925)
 ¿Cuál de las tres? (1925)
 Los hijos de la calle (1926)
 El otro amor (1926)
 La última primavera (1926)
 Resurrección (1926)
 El hijo de Clara (1927)
 La hija del verdugo (1927)
 El rescate de la cautiva (1927)
 El amor errante (1927)
 La ruta iluminada (1928)
 El último amor (1928)
 Frente al amor (1929)
 Sol en las cimas (1929)
 El sueño de una noche de verano (1929)
 La infinita sed (1930)
 Sonata patética (1930)
 Pasionaria (1930)
 Tú eres la vida (1930)
 El ocaso de los dioses (1930)
 Aurora roja (1931)
 Cara a la vida (1931)
 El amor que pasa (1931)
 Nocturno de amor (1931)
 Una mujer y dos hombres (1932)
 Amor en venta (1934)
 Nada más que una mujer (1935)
 Vidas sombrías (1935)
 Tres vidas de mujer (1937)
 La indomable (1938)
 Una vida (1940)
 Amor sin mañana	
 La rebelión de los siervos	
 La sombra del pasado	
 Martirio
 Nuestra Señora del Paralelo	
 Sinfonía apasionada	
 Una historia triste

Other works
 La mujer, problema del hombre (1932)
 Heroínas (1935)
 Buenaventura Durruti (1936)
 In Memoriam of Comrade Durruti (1936)
 La voz de la F.A.I. (1936)
 El anarquismo militante y la realidad española (1937)
 La incorporación de las masas populares a la historia: la Commune, primera revolución consciente (1937)
 Anselmo Lorenzo (1938)
 Cien días de la vida de una mujer (1949)
 Jaque a Franco (1949)
 Mujeres en la cárcel (1949)
 El problema de los sexos: matrimonio, unión libre y amor sin convivencia (1950)
 Pasión y muerte de los españoles en Francia (1950)
 María Silva: la libertaria (1951)
 El Éxodo: pasión y muerte de españoles en el exilio (1969)
 Problemas del anarquismo español (1971)
 Crónicas de CNT: 1960-1961 (1974)
 Qué es el anarquismo (1974)
 El éxodo anarquista (1977)
 Cuatro mujeres (1978)
 Seis años de mi vida (1978)
 Mis primeros cuarenta años (1987)

References

Bibliography

Further reading

 
   (vol. 1);  (vol. 2);  (vol.3). all from ChristieBooks.

External links
 Federica Montseny's works and biography
 Centre Federica Montseny
 large collection of anarchist posters from the Spanish Civil War (click Buscar)

1905 births
1994 deaths
20th-century essayists
20th-century Spanish novelists
20th-century Spanish poets
20th-century Spanish women writers
Anarcha-feminists
Anarchists from Catalonia
Anti-prostitution feminists
Catalan language activists
Catalan-language writers
Confederación Nacional del Trabajo members
Exiles of the Spanish Civil War in France
Feminist writers
Government ministers during the Second Spanish Republic
Health ministers of Spain
Mujeres Libres
People from Madrid
Politicians from Catalonia
Spanish children's writers
Spanish essayists
Spanish people of the Spanish Civil War (Republican faction)
Spanish romantic fiction writers
Spanish socialist feminists
Spanish syndicalists
Spanish women children's writers
Spanish women essayists
Spanish women novelists
Spanish women of the Spanish Civil War (Republican faction)
Spanish women poets
Spanish women's rights activists
Spanish writers in French
Women government ministers of Spain
Women in the Spanish Civil War
Women romantic fiction writers
Women writers from Catalonia
Spanish anarchists
Spanish Anti-Francoists